Philip Derek Lewis (28 November 1924 – 19 January 2017) was a Canadian politician who served in the Senate of Canada from 1978 to 1999. Lewis was a lawyer by profession.

He was nominated to the Senate by Prime Minister Pierre Trudeau under the St. John's, Newfoundland division. Lewis was a member of the Liberal party. He died in 2017, aged 92.

References

External links
 

1924 births
2017 deaths
Canadian senators from Newfoundland and Labrador
Lawyers in Newfoundland and Labrador
Liberal Party of Canada senators
Politicians from St. John's, Newfoundland and Labrador